The Gros Ventre Wilderness is located in Bridger-Teton National Forest in the U.S. state of Wyoming. Most of the Gros Ventre Range is located within the wilderness.

U.S. Wilderness Areas do not allow motorized or mechanized vehicles, including bicycles. Although camping and fishing are allowed with proper permit, no roads or buildings are constructed and there is also no logging or mining, in compliance with the 1964 Wilderness Act. Wilderness areas within National Forests and Bureau of Land Management areas also allow hunting in season.

Etymology : In French, Gros Ventre means big belly / big stomach.

See also
 List of U.S. Wilderness Areas

References

External links
 
 
 

IUCN Category Ib
Protected areas of Sublette County, Wyoming
Protected areas of Teton County, Wyoming
Wilderness areas of Wyoming
Greater Yellowstone Ecosystem
Bridger–Teton National Forest
Protected areas established in 1984
1984 establishments in Wyoming